The 1999 Queensland 500 was an endurance race for V8 Supercars, held at Queensland Raceway, near Ipswich, in Queensland, Australia on 19 September 1999. The race, which was the inaugural Queensland 500, was Round 12 of the 1999 Shell Championship Series.

The race was won by Larry Perkins and Russell Ingall driving a Holden Commodore (VT).

Results

Qualifying
Qualifying results:

Top 10 Qualifying
Top 10 Qualifying results:

Race
Level 1 teams raced in Class A.
Level 2 teams, usually referred to as privateers, raced in Class B.

Race results:

Statistics
 Provisional Pole Position - #4 Jason Bright - 1:09.8946
 Pole Position - #4 Jason Bright - 1:10.2952
 Fastest Lap - #5 Glenn Seton - 1:11.8804
 Average Speed - 143.70 km/h

References

External links
 Official Supercars website

Queensland 500
Queensland 500
Pre-Bathurst 500